Fausto Guido Valdiviezo Moscoso (August 21, 1959 in Guayaquil – April 11, 2013 in Atarazana, Guayaquil) was a senior Ecuadorian journalist and television presenter who was murdered after 29 years in journalism.

Career
Fausto Valdiviezo began as a journalist for several radio stations, and was in the decade of the 80s when he ventured into television as a reporter and news in the area and community. He worked for television networks Ecuavisa, Teleamazonas, SíTV (now Canal Uno), RTS and TC Televisión. Theirs was communication and was part of several means, the last Teleamazonas channel where he had worked and prepared to return to the TV in 2013.

Death
Valdiviezo was killed from gunshot wounds as he was shot by a man while he was driving. He left a message with his lawyers before he was killed which named his potential enemy if he happened to be killed. The ex-wife of the journalist declared to the Attorney that two cartons appeared to contain documents on allegations that the communicator had, would have disappeared hours after the murder.

Reactions
Irina Bokova, UNESCO's director-general, condemned Fausto Valdiviezo Moscoso's murder.

See also
List of unsolved murders

References

1959 births
2013 murders in Ecuador
2013 deaths
Assassinated Ecuadorian journalists
Male journalists
Ecuadorian television presenters
Male murder victims
Unsolved murders in Ecuador
Deaths by firearm in Ecuador